The following is a list of fusion power technologies that have been practically attempted:

Pioneers
  Beam-target (Oliphant, 1934)
  Convergent shock-waves (Huemul, Argentina)
  Magneto-electrostatic toroid trap (ATOLL, Artsimovich)
  Tokamak (T-1 to 10, Kurchatov Institute, JET, ITER is under construction, and many more)
  Toroidal z-pinch (ZETA)

Magnetic

 Accelerated FRC (TCS-U)
 Bumpy torus (ELMO, EBT, ORNL)
 Galatea (Tornado)
 Magnetic suspension (Levitron)
 High beta tokamak (HBT-EP)
 Levitated dipole
 Odd-parity RMF
 Reversed field pinch (MST, RFX-Mod Italy)
 Spherical tokamak (MAST, NSTX)
 Spheromak (SSPX Lawrence Livermore)
 Stellarator (Wendelstein 7-X)
 Non-neutral plasma (Columbia Non-neutral Torus)
 Compact (NCSX Princeton [cancelled])
 Tandem Mirror (Gamma-10 Japan)

Inertial

 Laser Inertial (NIF) - direct drive
 Inertial confinement fusion - indirect drive
 Inertial confinement fusion - Fast Ignition
 Heavy ion fusion (HIF, HIFAR Lawrence Berkeley)
 MAGLIF: Combination pinch and laser ICF

Z-Pinch

 Pulsed z-pinch (Saturn, Sandia)
 High density Z-pinch (MAGPIE Imperial College)
 Inverse Z-pinch
 Shear Flow Stabilized (Zap Energy)

Inertial Electrostatic Confinement

 Fusor (Fusor, Farnsworth)
 IEC (Fusor, Hirsch-Meeks)
 IEC with Periodically Oscillating Plasma Sphere (POPS, LANL)
 IEC with plasma electrode (PoF, Sanns)
 IEC with beam/spherical capacitor (STAR, Sesselmann)
 Polywell (Fusor and Magnetic mirror hybrid)
 IEC with Penning trap (Penning Fusion Experiment - PFX, LANL)
 F1 (electrostatic and magnetic cusp hybrid - Fusion One)

Other/Combinatorial

 CT Accel (CTIX, UC Davis)
 Magneto-kinetic (PHDX, Plasma Dynamic Lab)
 Magnetized target (AFRL, LANL)
 Magneto-inertial (OMEGA laser, LLE, Rochester)
 Levitated dipole [superconducting] (LDX, MIT, PSGC)
 Maryland Centrifugal (MCX)
 Sheared magnetofluid/Bernoulli confinement (MBX, Uni Texas)
 Penning fusion (PFX, LANL)
 Plasma jets (HyperV, Chantilly)
 Magnetized target fusion with mechanical compression (General Fusion, Burnaby) 
 Field-reversed colliding beams (Tri-Alpha)
 Muon-catalyzed fusion (Berkeley, Alvarez)
 Dense Plasma Focus (Focus fusion, Lawrenceville Plasma Physics, Lerner)
 Rotating lithium wall (RWE, Maryland)

References

See also 
 Fusion One Corporation Website
 Magnetized target fusion technology description by General Fusion
 Inertial Confinement Fusion at NIF - How ICF Works 
 Focus Fusion Home Page
 EMC2 Fusion Development Corporation